Lardizabala is a monotypic genus of flowering plants. These plants are evergreen lianas, native to temperate forests of central and southern Chile.
The sole species is Lardizabala biternata Ruiz & Pav, known as Coguil, Cogüilera, Coiye, Coille, Voqui cógüil, or  Voqui coille, in Chile, and known as Lardizabala or Zabala fruit in English. It is grown for its edible fruits (called coguil or cógüil in Mapuche language) and ornamental flowers.

References

External links

 "Lardizabala biternata" en enciclopedia de la flora Chilena
 Chilebosque, flora of Chile, with photos, including of fruits
Lardizabala biternata

Lardizabalaceae
Monotypic Ranunculales genera
Flora of Chile
Garden plants of South America